The Legend and the Hero is a 2007 Chinese television series adapted from the 16th-century novel Fengshen Yanyi (also known as Investiture of the Gods or Creation of the Gods) written by Xu Zhonglin and Lu Xixing. The first season started airing on CCTV-8 in February 2007. It was followed by a sequel, The Legend and the Hero 2 in 2009.

Cast

 Fan Bingbing as Daji
 Steve Ma as King Zhou of Shang
 Zhou Jie as King Wu of Zhou
 Liu Dekai as Jiang Ziya
 Miao Haizhong as Shen Gongbao
 Tang Guoqiang as Yuanshi Tianzun
 Eddie Kwan as Bo Yikao
 Jin Qiaoqiao as Queen Jiang
 Xu Huanshan as Wen Zhong
 Liu Tao as Chang'e
 Wu Ma as Shang Rong
 Bonnie Xian as Nezha
Leo Wu as young Nezha
 Han Dong as Yang Jian
 Chen Ganlin as Jinzha
 Zhang Chao as Muzha
 Yang Long as Huang Tianhua
 Li Botun as Leizhenzi
 Tay Ping Hui as Huang Feihu
 Du Zhiguo as Su Hu
 Guo Kaimin as Bi Gan
 Lou Qi as Wu Ji
 Priscelia Chan as Zixian
 Han Zhi as Huang Feibao
 Xie Run as Nüwa
 Tian Jingshan as King Wen of Zhou
 Yao Yunshun as Fei Zhong
 Xu Ming as You Hun
 Li Yuan as E'lai
 Wu Jiani as Hu Ximei
 Yan Boya as Fenglai
 Mao Jian as San Yisheng
 Lü Shigang as Nangong Shi
 Li Qingxiang as Tongtian Cult Master
 Cheng Lidong as Wenshu Guangfa Tianzun
 Xiao Bing as Nanji Xianweng
 Ding Yujia as White Crane Boy
 Zhu Feng as Yin Pobai
 Zhao Jintao as Yin Hong
 Ran Qiaoqun as Immortal Puxian
 Xu Jingyi as Juliusun
 Jin Youpeng as Guangchengzi
 Li Jun as Chijingzi
 Li Jianxin as Chong Houhu
 Feng Chunzhe as Consort Huang
 Yang Guang as Consort Yang
 Zhang Bojun as Li Jing
 Liu Wei as Yu Hua
 Liu Xiaohu as Su Quanzhong
 Xie Jiaqi as Zheng Lun
 Wang Xiaofeng as Yurong
 Xu Songzi as Lady Ma
 Zhou Yuefang as Queen Mother of the West
 Zhong Minghe as Huang Gun
 Su Mao as Zhang Guifang
 Lou Yajiang as Zhou Ji
 Zhou Zhong as Huang Ming
 Yu Jinsheng as Long Huan
 Cheng Dachun as Wu Qian
 Yi Kun as Ji Li
 Dong Meng as Yu Qing
 Wang Wensheng as Lu Xiong
 Laopi as Chong Heihu
 Sun Dahao as Chong Yingbiao
 Chen Longzhan as Immortal Du'e
 Du Hongjun as Welkin Lord Zhang
 Zhao Le as Zhao Gongming
 Wang Xinfen as Yunxiao
 Liu Shuzhen as Bixiao
 Liu Chaomei as Qiongxiao
 Shang Yisha as Holy Mother of Golden Light
 Liu Rongsheng as Welkin Lord Qin
 Zhao Enquan as Welkin Lord Zhao
 Shi Jipu as Welkin Lord Dong
 Dong Jie as Welkin Lord Yuan
 Wang Hongjun as Welkin Lord Sun
 Zhang Haiping as Welkin Lord Bai
 Jiao Changqiu as Welkin Lord Wang
 Chen Weiguo as Welkin Lord Yao
 Zhu Dongning as Chen Jiugong
 Guo Xirui as Daode Zhenjun
 Cui Zai as Yunzhongzi
 Zhu Jiazhen as Han Dulong
 Gong Zhixue as Xue E'hu
 Chen Jie as Lihuangshi
 Zhang Xueying as Caiyun

See also
 Gods of Honour, a similar 2001 Hong Kong TV series.

External links
  The Legend and the Hero on Sina.com
  The Legend and the Hero on TTV's website

2007 Chinese television series debuts
2007 Chinese television series endings
Television shows based on Investiture of the Gods
Mandarin-language television shows